The FIBA Korać Cup Finals was the championship finals of the FIBA Korać Cup competition. FIBA Korać Cup was the name of the third-tier level European professional club basketball competition. The competition was organized by FIBA Europe. It was named after Radivoj Korać, a top Yugoslav basketball player.

Title holders

 1972:  Lokomotiva
 1973:  Birra Forst Cantù
 1973–74:  Birra Forst Cantù
 1974–75:  Birra Forst Cantù
 1975–76:  Jugoplastika
 1976–77:  Jugoplastika
 1977–78:  Partizan
 1978–79:  Partizan
 1979–80:  Arrigoni Rieti
 1980–81:  Joventut Freixenet
 1981–82:  Limoges CSP
 1982–83:  Limoges CSP
 1983–84:  Orthez
 1984–85:  Simac Milano
 1985–86:  Banco Roma
 1986–87:  FC Barcelona
 1987–88:  Real Madrid
 1988–89:  Partizan
 1989–90:  Ram Joventut
 1990–91:  Shampoo Clear Cantù
 1991–92:  il Messaggero Roma
 1992–93:  Philips Milano
 1993–94:  PAOK Bravo
 1994–95:  Alba Berlin
 1995–96:  Efes Pilsen
 1996–97:  Aris
 1997–98:  Riello Mash Verona
 1998–99:  FC Barcelona
 1999–00:  Limoges CSP
 2000–01:  Unicaja
 2001–02:  SLUC Nancy

Finals

References

Finals